Pterolophia discalis is a species of beetle in the family Cerambycidae. It was described by Gressitt in 1951. It is known from Vietnam and China.

References

discalis
Beetles described in 1951